"Pressure" is a song by American singer Ari Lennox, released as a single on September 10, 2021, through Dreamville and Interscope Records. It is the lead single from Lennox's second studio album Age/Sex/Location, and samples the bass line from Shirley Brown's 1977 song "Blessed Is the Woman (With a Man Like Mine)". Produced by Jermaine Dupri and Bryan-Michael Cox, "Pressure" is Lennox's highest-charting solo single, reaching number 66 on the US Billboard Hot 100 chart.

Critical reception
Latesha Harris of NPR described the track as "a half-Motown, half-808s fantasia about being the center of attention during foreplay" and wrote that it "elevates [Lennox's] status as a neo-soul touchstone, referencing the soul divas before her and leading the way for those to come with fearless, intoxicating charm".

Music video
The music video was released on September 11, 2021, and written and directed by Chandler Lass. It is partly an homage to singers Diana Ross and Donna Summer.

Charts

Weekly charts

Year-end charts

Certifications

References

2021 singles
2021 songs
Ari Lennox songs
Songs written by Ari Lennox
Songs written by Bryan-Michael Cox
Songs written by Jermaine Dupri
Songs written by Johntá Austin
Song recordings produced by Bryan-Michael Cox
Song recordings produced by Jermaine Dupri